Moko is a village in the Bagassi Department of Balé Province in southern Burkina Faso. The village has a population of 700.

References

Populated places in the Boucle du Mouhoun Region
Balé Province